Burchfiel Grove and Arboretum is an arboretum located on Hardin Lane, Sevierville, Tennessee. It is open daily without charge.

The arboretum is a part of a greenway system running along the Little Pigeon River. It is maintained by the Sevierville Parks and Recreation Department, and contains over 30 labeled tree species and numerous types of shrubs.

See also
 List of botanical gardens in the United States
 Sevier County, Tennessee

Arboreta in Tennessee
Botanical gardens in Tennessee
Protected areas of Sevier County, Tennessee